Thomas Silvero (born 19 May 2000) is an Argentine professional footballer who plays as a forward for Newell's Old Boys, on loan from Crucero del Norte.

Career
Silvero got his career underway with Crucero del Norte. He made six appearances in the 2016–17 Primera B Nacional, including for his professional bow on 19 March 2017 during an away loss to Gimnasia y Esgrima; that campaign ended with relegation. He netted his first senior goal in the following November in Torneo Federal A against Gimnasia y Tiro, in what was one of six appearances across two seasons in the third tier. On 23 January 2019, Silvero joined Primera División side Newell's Old Boys on loan.

Career statistics
.

References

External links

2000 births
Living people
People from Posadas, Misiones
Argentine footballers
Association football forwards
Primera Nacional players
Torneo Federal A players
Crucero del Norte footballers
Newell's Old Boys footballers
Sportspeople from Misiones Province